The South Australian Railways X class was a class of 2-6-0 steam locomotives operated by the South Australian Railways on its narrow-gauge lines.

History
In 1881–82, Baldwin Locomotive Works delivered eight 2-6-0 locomotives to the South Australian Railways (SAR) for use on its  network. Initially two were allocated to the Port Wakefield line, two to Port Pirie and four to Port Augusta. All were transferred to Peterborough to operate construction trains on the Broken Hill line and then providing motive power on the line, including operating into New South Wales via the Silverton Tramway.

In December 1896, number 49 was sold to Western Australian timber mill Millar Bros hauling trains around Denmark and Palgarup before being scrapped in 1944. The other seven remained with the SAR until withdrawn in the 1900s with the last lasting until April 1907.

References

Baldwin locomotives
Railway locomotives introduced in 1881
X
2-6-0 locomotives
3 ft 6 in gauge locomotives of Australia